Leptalia macilenta is a species of beetle in the family Cerambycidae, the only species in the genus Leptalia.

References

Lepturinae